Latah may refer to:
 Latah, a culture-specific startle disorder
 Latah County, Idaho
 Latah, Washington 
 Latah Creek 
 Latah Formation